No Such Thing as the News is a British television comedy series on BBC Two, which is a spin-off to the podcast No Such Thing as a Fish, produced and presented by the researchers behind the panel game QI, also on BBC Two. In it each of the researchers – James Harkin, Andrew Hunter Murray, Anna Ptaszynski and Dan Schreiber – collectively known as "The QI Elves", present their favourite facts related to the previous week's news.

Format
In each episode the Elves present their favourite fact that week which is connected to that week's news, and discuss related news and facts about it. They also read out news stories sent to them by viewers, which as of the second series is in a segment called "Special Correspondence", and also highlight other stories they did not have time to examine in greater depth. In the first series the end of the show also features a small sketch in which Dan goes over to BBC newsreader Jane Hill. In the second series the beginning of the show features a sketch with Hill and Matthew Amroliwala reading some obscure news stories, before the opening titles play.

On Friday, 17 February 2017 the Elves began a weekly Facebook Live topical broadcast summing up the week's news in a similar style to the television programme.

Origin
No Such Thing as the News is a television spin-off to the No Such Thing as a Fish podcast, which sees the QI elves discuss their favourite facts that they had learned that week. The show's title comes from one of the facts revealed in the QI TV series. In the third episode of eighth series, also known as "Series H", an episode on the theme of "Hoaxes" reported that, after a lifetime studying fish, the biologist Stephen Jay Gould concluded that there was no such thing as a fish. He reasoned that while there are many sea creatures, most of them are not closely related to each other. For example, a salmon is more closely related to a camel than it is to a hagfish. The opening of early episodes of the podcast used to feature a recording of the elves mentioning this fact, which appears in the first paragraph of the Oxford Dictionary of Underwater Life.

Production
The series was commissioned by James Harding, Director of BBC News. The show was recorded at the Up the Creek Comedy Club in Greenwich, London, and is produced by John Lloyd, the creator of QI. A pilot episode was made, which was not broadcast on TV but was released as Episode 114 of No Such Thing as a Fish.

Reception
In a review for Chortle Steve Bennett wrote: "If you're a curious person too, your interest will definitely be piqued by the info imparted (now my internet search history includes 'didgeridoo in space' and 'sticky google car') and in a most entertaining way. Though quite what the weird handover to Jane Hill in the BBC newsroom just to call Schreiber 'Bernard' was all about defies explanation."

On Episode 130 of No Such Thing as a Fish it was announced that Series 2 would begin on 12 October 2016 at 11:15pm on BBC2.

List of episodes

Footnotes

References

External links
 Official website
 
 
 

2010s British comedy television series
2016 British television series debuts
2016 British television series endings
BBC high definition shows
BBC television comedy
British television spin-offs
English-language television shows
QI